The Hotchkiss "type Universal" is a submachine gun manufactured in France after World War II. It was originally designed as a semi-automatic police carbine but a full automatic version was made. It fires from a closed bolt. Its most unique feature however is that it folds up into a very compact package and unfolds easily and relatively quickly. The semi-automatic version was exported in very limited numbers to many countries. Many were also exported to Venezuela and Morocco.

Users

See also
List of submachine guns
Gevarm D4
MAT-49
Sola submachine gun
Vigneron submachine gun

References

9mm Parabellum submachine guns
Submachine guns of France
Cold War weapons of France
Infantry weapons of the Cold War
Hotchkiss et Cie